Demenika is a village/suburb in the municipality of Patras, Achaea, Greece. It is part of the community of Saravali within the municipal unit of Messatida. It is 2 km northeast of Ovrya and 4 km east of Paralia. The population was 2,783 in 2011. The Greek National Road 33 (Patras - Tripoli) passes through the village, and the new Greek National Road 9 (Patras - Pyrgos) passes south of the village.

Historical population

See also
List of settlements in Achaea

References

Messatida
Populated places in Achaea